Heaven Scent is an Australian rock band. In 2002 they donated the proceeds from their single "Short Goodbyes" (which reached No. 99 on the ARIA singles chart) to charity.

Members
Justin Murphy – vocals, guitar
Zoltan "Zoli" Juhasz – guitar
Scott Marvelley – bass
Aaron Potter – drums
Felice "Fletch" Lomuto – keyboards
Paul Edwards – guitar

Discography

Albums
Long Story Short (2002) – Sound Vault

EPs
Rain (1997)

Singles
"Am I Crazy?" (2000)
"Short Goodbyes" (2002)
"Anything For You" (2002)

References

Australian rock music groups